Kim Kyung-Jae ( – 2002) was the first human being to die from playing a video games too much. He died of deep-vein thrombosis or DVT after playing the Webzen video game Mu for 86 hours in Gwangju, with pauses only to purchase cigarettes and to use the bathroom. Although no medical report is available in English, it is worth noting that prolonged immobility as well as vein condition are diatheses that increase the odds of contracting deep vein thrombosis.

References

External links 
 https://www.theguardian.com/computergames/story/0,,1275067,00.html 
 https://web.archive.org/web/20070930205009/http://www.mg.co.za/articledirect.aspx?area=mg_flat&articleid=134364
 http://www.findarticles.com/p/articles/mi_zdcgw/is_200309/ai_n9519207

1970s births
2002 deaths
Video game culture
Year of birth missing
Deaths from thrombosis